Gymnopilus marticorenai is a species of mushroom in the family Hymenogastraceae.

See also

List of Gymnopilus species

External links
Gymnopilus marticorenai at Index Fungorum

marticorenai
Fungi of North America